The Texans' flagship radio stations are KILT SportsRadio 610AM and KILT 100.3FM. The AM station has an all-sports format, while the FM station plays contemporary country music. Both are owned by CBS Radio. Marc Vandermeer is the play-by-play announcer.  1989 Heisman Trophy winner Andre Ware provides color commentary, and John Harris serves as a sideline reporter. Preseason games are telecast by KTRK, an ABC owned and operated station. Kevin Kugler calls the preseason games on TV, with former Oilers running back Spencer Tillman providing color commentary. 

Spanish-language radio broadcasts of the team's games are aired on KLOL Mega 101 FM.

Radio broadcasters

Houston Texans announcers
Houston Texans
broadcasters